"Jamie Douglas" is Child Ballad 204, existing in numerous variants, such as "The Water Is Wide/Waly Waly".  In the Roud Folk Song Index it is number 87, with more than 80 listed variants. This ballad is believed to refer to the ostensibly unhappy first marriage of James Douglas, 2nd Marquess of Douglas to Lady Barbara Erskine.

Synopsis

The hero—usually Earl Douglas—has married the first-person narrator, but she was slandered, accused of adultery with another man.  The heroine bitterly laments that his heart grew cold to her.  Her father sends men to fetch her home, and she goes, urging her husband to be kind to their three children.  Her father may promise to divorce them and marry her to a greater lord, and she always fiercely repudiates any such effort; she would not trade one kiss from her husband for any lord.

External links
Jamie Douglas, many variants
Jamie Douglas two variants

Child Ballads
Year of song unknown